Madison Square Garden (MSG III) was an indoor arena in New York City, the third bearing that name. Built in 1925 and closed in 1968, it was located on the west side of Eighth Avenue between 49th and 50th streets in Manhattan, on the site of the city's trolley-car barns. It was the first Garden that was not located near Madison Square. MSG III was the home of the New York Rangers of the National Hockey League and the New York Knicks of the National Basketball Association, and also hosted numerous boxing matches, the Millrose Games, concerts, and other events. In 1968 it was demolished and its role and name passed to the fourth Madison Square Garden, which stands at the site of the original Penn Station. One Worldwide Plaza was built on the arena's former 50th Street location.

Groundbreaking
Groundbreaking on the third Madison Square Garden took place on January 9, 1925. Designed by
the theater architect Thomas W. Lamb, it was built at the cost of $4.75 million in 349 days by boxing promoter Tex Rickard, who assembled backers he called his "600 millionaires" to fund the project.  The new arena was dubbed "The House That Tex Built."  In contrast to the ornate towers of Stanford White's  second Garden, the exterior of MSG III was a simple box. Its most distinctive feature was the ornate marquee above the main entrance, with seemingly endless abbreviations (Tomw., V/S, Rgrs, Tonite, Thru, etc.) Even the name of the arena was abbreviated, to "Madison Sq. Garden".

It had poor sight lines, especially for hockey, and fans sitting virtually anywhere behind the first row of the side balcony could count on having some portion of the ice obstructed. The poor ventilation and allowed smoking often caused haze in the upper portions of the Garden.

Madison Square Garden III was managed by Rickard, John S. Hammond, William F. Carey, General John Reed Kilpatrick, Ned Irish and Irving Mitchell Felt. It was eventually replaced by the fourth Madison Square Garden.

Events

Sports

Boxing
Boxing was Madison Square Garden III's principal claim to fame. The first bout took place on December 8, 1925, a week before its official opening. On January 17, 1941, 23,190 people witnessed Fritzie Zivic's successful welterweight title defense against Henry Armstrong, still the largest crowd at any of the Gardens.

Hockey
The New York Rangers, owned by the Garden's owner Tex Rickard, got their name from a play on words involving his name: Tex's Rangers. However, the Rangers were not the first NHL team to play at the Garden; the New York Americans had begun play in 1925 – and officially opened the Garden in front of 17,000 by losing to the Montreal Canadiens, 3-1 – Shorty Green of the Americans was the first player to score a goal in the arena. The Americans were so tremendously successful that Rickard wanted his own team. The Rangers were founded in 1926 and played their first game in the Garden on November 16, 1926. Both teams played at the Garden until the Americans suspended operations in 1942 due to World War II. In the meantime, the Rangers had usurped the Americans with their own success, winning three Stanley Cups between 1928 and 1940. The refusal of the Garden's management to allow the postwar resurrection of the Americans team was one popular theory underlying the Curse of 1940, which supposedly prevented the Rangers from winning another Stanley Cup until 1994. Another alleged cause of "The Curse" stemmed from manager Kilpatrick burning the Garden's mortgage papers in the bowl of the Stanley Cup, made possible by receipts from the 1940 Cup run. Hockey purists believed that the trophy had been "defiled", leading to the Rangers' woes.

The New York Rovers, a farm team of the Rangers, played in the Garden on Sunday afternoons, while the Rangers played on Wednesday and Sunday nights. Tommy Lockhart managed the Rovers games and introduced on-ice promotions such as racing model aircraft and bicycles around the arena, figure skating acts Shipstads & Johnson Ice Follies and Sonja Henie, and a skating grizzly bear. The fourth floor of the Garden had a second sheet of ice, used for public skating, recreational hockey, and as the Rangers' practice facility.

Basketball
The first professional basketball game was played in the 50th Street Garden on December 6, 1925, nine days before the arena officially opened. It pitted the Original Celtics against the Washington Palace Five. The Celtics won 35-31. The New York Knicks debuted there in 1946, although if there was an important college game, they played in the 69th Regiment Armory. Due to other event bookings in the arena, all their home games during the 1951, 1952 and 1953 NBA Finals were played at the Armory; thus MSG III never hosted an NBA Finals game. MSG III hosted the NBA All-Star Game in 1954, 1955 and 1968.

In 1931, a highly successful college basketball triple header raised money for Mayor Jimmy Walker's Unemployment Relief Fund.  In 1934, Ned Irish began promoting a successful series of college basketball double headers at the Garden featuring a mix of local and national teams.  MSG III began hosting the National Invitation Tournament annually in 1938, and hosted seven NCAA men's basketball championship finals between 1943 and 1950. On February 28, 1940, Madison Square Garden hosted the first televised basketball games in a Fordham-Pitt and Georgetown-NYU doubleheader. A point shaving scandal involving games played at the Garden led the NCAA to reduce its use of the Garden, and caused some schools, including 1950 NCAA and NIT Champion City College of New York (CCNY), to be banned from playing there.

Professional wrestling
Capitol Wrestling Corporation—along with its successor, the World Wide Wrestling Federation—promoted professional wrestling at the Garden during its last two decades.  Toots Mondt and Jess McMahon owned CWC, which initially promoted tag team wrestling.  Throughout the 1950s and 1960s, Mondt and McMahon were successful at promoting ethnic heroes of Puerto Rican or Italian descent.

Two historic wrestling events took place at MSG III.  On May 17, 1963, Bruno Sammartino defeated "Nature Boy" Buddy Rogers, via submission, in 48 seconds, to become the second ever WWWF World Heavyweight Champion.  On November 19, 1957, the Dr. Jerry Graham & Dick the Bruiser vs. Edouard Carpentier & Argentina Rocca main event led to a race riot involving Italian and Puerto Rican fans of Carpentier and Rocca.  After the riot, New York City nearly banned professional wrestling and children under the age of 14 were prohibited from attending.

Cycling
From 1925 until 1961, Madison Square Garden hosted the Six Days of New York, an annual six-day racing event of track cycling. Upon its final running, it was the longest-running series in the world with 73 editions.

Other entertainment

The Circus
The Ringling Bros. and Barnum & Bailey Circus debuted at the second Garden in 1919, and the third Garden continued to host numerous performances. The circus was so important to the Garden that for the 1928 Stanley Cup Finals, the Rangers were forced to play all their games on the road, but they still won the series. The circus performed as often as three times daily throughout the life of the third Garden, repeatedly knocking the Rangers out of the Garden at playoff time.

The circus acrobatics included acts in the rings, on the high wire, and trapeze. One dramatic act which was only performed in the Garden, and never taken on the road with the traveling circus, involved Blinc Candlin, a Hudson, New York fireman, who rode his antique 1880s high-wheel bicycle on the high wire every season for over two decades beginning in the 1910s and running well through the 1930s.

Dog Show
The Garden continued to host The Westminster Kennel Club's annual dog show. This championship is the second longest continuously running U.S. sporting event (behind only the Kentucky Derby).

Other events

 The very first event held at the third Garden was a bicycle race held from November 24–29, 1925, several weeks before the official opening of the arena.
 Although MSG III never hosted a national political convention (see below), in 1932 Franklin Delano Roosevelt continued a tradition begun in 1892 by Grover Cleveland, when 22,000 people rallied to support him in his bid for the U.S. presidency.  Herbert Hoover also delivered his final campaign speech for the 1932 election at the Garden. In 1936, Roosevelt delivered his last campaign speech there before the election. 
 On March 15, 1937, a massive "Boycott Nazi Germany" rally was held in the Garden, sponsored by the American Jewish Congress and the Jewish Labor Committee.  John L. Lewis of the Congress of Industrial Organizations and New York City mayor Fiorello LaGuardia were among the speakers.
 Ice skater and film star Sonia Henie brought her Hollywood Ice Review to the Garden in 1938, drawing more than 15,000 fans.
 On February 20, 1939, a pro-Nazi organization called German American Bund held a rally of 20,000 at the third Garden. By December 1941, the federal government had outlawed the group.
 During the height of its popularity during the Great Depression, the Communist Party USA held mass rallies which filled the stadium.
 In 1940, 13,000 people attended the rodeo, featuring Gene Autry.
 On March 9, 1942, a mass memorial service for the 2,000,000 Jews known to have been murdered by the Nazis to that time in Axis-occupied Europe, was held in the venue. The service was called We Will Never Die. 40,000 people attended the two performances that day.
 In 1957, evangelist Billy Graham held a New York City mission at the Garden, which ran nightly for 16 weeks.
 Elizabeth Taylor was the host when Hollywood producer Mike Todd held an anniversary party for his film Around the World in 80 Days on October 17, 1957, featuring Marilyn Monroe riding an elephant.
 President John F. Kennedy's birthday party in May 1962 was held at the Garden, where Marilyn Monroe memorably sang "Happy Birthday, Mr. President".
 In the early 1960s, MSG III was the site of the Daily News Jazz Festival.

Closure and demolition
On November 3, 1960, Penn Station's owners Pennsylvania Railroad announced they had sold their air rights to the Madison Square Garden corporation, to build a new arena replacing Penn Station's original building. Previously, Madison Square Garden sought to replace the arena as early as the 1950’s due to poor sight lines from the upper decks. Even though the Rangers played poorly during this time, they still sold out game after game. Added to the rising popularity of the Knicks, the demand for a new arena grew. Demolition  of Penn Station commenced in 1963, and the new Madison Square Garden was completed in 1968 with its first event being held on February 12, 1968. Originally the third Garden was planned to close at the end of the summer of 1967 but construction delays pushed the opening to February 1968. The final Rangers game was held on February 11, 1968, resulting in a 3-3 tie against the Detroit Red Wings. Jean Ratelle was the last player to score a goal in the arena with 19:15 remaining in the third. After the game, former Ranger greats along with players representing other NHL teams over the previous 43 years, including New York Americans players, skated on the ice in a closure ceremony. Two days later, the last event in the Garden was the Westminster Dog Show.

There were no plans to keep the old Madison Square Garden and demolition commenced in the summer of 1968, finishing in early 1969. After the third Madison Square Garden was torn down, there was a proposal to build the world's tallest building on the site, prompting a major battle in the Hell's Kitchen neighborhood where it was located. Ultimately, the debate resulted in strict height restrictions in the area. The space remained a parking lot until 1989 when Worldwide Plaza, designed by David Childs of Skidmore, Owings and Merrill, opened on the site of the old Garden.

Cultural references
 The Hollywood movie Rhythm on the Range starring Bing Crosby was filmed in part at MSGIII during the 1935 rodeo.
 The 50th Street Garden never held a national Democratic or Republican presidential nominating convention, because neither party met in New York to select their presidential candidates between 1924 and 1976. Despite this, some of the climactic scenes of the thriller film The Manchurian Candidate (1962), in which a brainwashed assassin attempts to kill a presidential nominee at a convention, was filmed at the third Garden.
 MSG III was featured prominently in the story of Ron Howard's film Cinderella Man (2005), although exterior montage shots glorified it by placing it against the Times Square signs on Broadway, when in fact the building was one block west.
 Several Warner Bros. cartoons referred to the arena as "Madison Round Garden", and the Popeye cartoon Brotherly Love referred to the Garden as "Patterson Square Garden."
 A 1958 episode entitled "Rodeo" of the CBS crime drama television series, Richard Diamond, Private Detective, starring David Janssen, is a dramatization of the murder of a rodeo performer, Ed Murdock, played by Lee Van Cleef, who seeks to reclaim the top prize at Madison Square Garden before he retires to an isolated ranch. His wife, Marcy (Barbara Baxley) conspires with Charles Decker (Harry Lauter) to have him murdered and to frame another rodeo performer for the crime. Dan Blocker appears in the episode as Cloudy Sims, still another rodeo cowboy.
 The Damon Runyon story "The Hottest Guy In The World" revolves around a fictional event where a baby is captured by a circus gorilla named Bongo who snatches the baby from a baby carriage and climbs up to the roof of the third Garden on the 49th Street side. The baby is saved by the character Big Jule shooting Bongo between the eyes, sending him backwards onto the roof.

See also

 Madison Square Garden (1879)
 Madison Square Garden (1890)
 Madison Square Garden (1968)
 Madison Square Garden Bowl

References

External links
 Arena information

.1925
Basketball venues in New York City
Basketball Association of America venues
Boxing venues in New York City
Convention centers in New York City
Defunct boxing venues in the United States
Defunct college basketball venues in the United States
Defunct concert halls in the United States
Defunct indoor arenas in New York City
Defunct National Hockey League venues
Defunct sports venues in Manhattan
Demolished buildings and structures in Manhattan
Demolished sports venues in New York (state)
Former music venues in New York City
Former National Basketball Association venues
Former sports venues in New York City
Indoor ice hockey venues in New York City
Indoor track and field venues in New York (state)
Music venues in Manhattan
NCAA Division I men's basketball tournament Final Four venues
New York Americans
New York Knicks venues
St. John's Red Storm basketball venues
Sports venues completed in 1925
Sports venues demolished in 1968
Thomas W. Lamb buildings
1920s architecture in the United States
1925 establishments in New York City
1968 disestablishments in New York (state)
Hell's Kitchen, Manhattan
New York Rangers